The 1852 United States presidential election in Arkansas took place on November 2, 1852, as part of the 1852 United States presidential election. Voters chose four representatives, or electors to the Electoral College, who voted for president and vice president.

Arkansas voted for the Democratic candidate, Franklin Pierce, over Whig candidate Winfield Scott. Pierce won Arkansas by a margin of 24.36%.

Results

See also
 United States presidential elections in Arkansas

References

Arkansas
1852
1852 Arkansas elections